Plymouth Township is the name of two places in the U.S. state of Pennsylvania:

Plymouth Township, Luzerne County, Pennsylvania
Plymouth Township, Montgomery County, Pennsylvania

Pennsylvania township disambiguation pages